Phyllonorycter junoniella is a moth of the family Gracillariidae. It is known from all of  Europe, except Ireland, the Iberian Peninsula and the Balkan Peninsula.

The wingspan is 7–8 mm. There are two generations per year with adults on wing in June and July and again later in the autumn.

The larvae feed on Vaccinium vitis-idaea. They mine the leaves of their host plant. They create a lower-surface tentiform mine, spanning almost the entire leaf. The leaf margins are strongly pulled together, arching the upper surface. Because the leaf tissue of the roof of the mine is incompletely eaten away, this upper surface has a mottled appearance.

References

junoniella
Moths of Europe
Moths described in 1846